Jelly Roll Morton: The Complete Library of Congress Recordings is a 2005 box set of recordings from jazz pioneer Jelly Roll Morton.  The set spans 128 tracks over eight CDs. It won two Grammy Awards in 2006, Best Historical Album and Best Album Notes.

Background 
In 1938, noted musicologist and Morton biographer Alan Lomax conducted a series of interviews with Morton at the Library of Congress. Richard Cook and Brian Morton describe these recordings as Jelly Roll Morton's "virtual history of the birth pangs of jazz as it happened in the New Orleans of the turn of the century. His memory was unimpaired, although he chose to tell things as he preferred to remember them, perhaps; and his hands were still in complete command of the keyboard."

Excerpts from the sessions first appeared on a 1948 album. Riverside Records issued the recordings as LP records in 1955.  Ron Wynn and Bruce Boyd Raeburn note that "though the albums came out posthumously, the interviews generated tremendous new interest in Morton's life and music." During the 1990s, Rounder Records released a series of compact discs including the musical content, but not the dialogue, from the 1938 sessions. Both the Riverside and earlier Rounder releases were heavily expurgated, and as recently as 2008, when selections from the complete Rounder collection were featured in a BBC Radio 4 documentary on Morton, presenter Marybeth Hamilton noted that, even then, some of the recordings were still considered unsuitable for broadcast, due to the obscene nature of some of the lyrics and Morton's narration.

2005 release 
In 2005, Rounder released the 1938 recordings in their entirety as part of an eight-disc box set.  The first seven discs include Lomax's 1938 interviews, in which Morton describes his life and the early days of jazz, plays piano, and sings. The eighth disc includes 1949 recordings of Morton's contemporaries, reminiscing about Morton and providing musical demonstrations.

The set was originally released in a piano-shaped box and included a copy of Mister Jelly Roll, Lomax's biography about Morton. The set also includes a PDF file including additional liner notes, complete transcriptions of the recorded dialogue and lyrics, additional unrecorded interviews and archival documents and photos.

In 2007, Rounder released Jelly Roll Morton: The Library of Congress Recordings by Alan Lomax, a single disc consisting of selected highlights from the box set.

Reception 

arwulf arwulf , writing for allmusic, described the recordings as having been "beautifully restored."

Harvey Pekar, writing for The Austin Chronicle, gave the set a five-star rating (of a possible five), noting that "[Morton's] oral history here is provocative, and his playing bears out some of the hard-to-believe statements that have been made by (and about) him."

Richard Cook and Brian Morton, writing for The Penguin Guide to Jazz, gave the set a four-star rating (of a possible four), describing it as "surely the most comprehensive coverage of the speech and music to date.… It is a wonderfully illustrated lecture on Morton's music by the man who created it. Indispensable records for anyone interested in jazz history."

Track listing

Credits
Jelly Roll Morton – piano, vocals, guitar, commentary
Alan Lomax – interviewer
Johnny St. Cyr – guitar, commentary
Leonard Bechet – commentary
Paul Dominguez Jr. – guitar, commentary
Albert Glenny – commentary
Alphonse Picou – commentary
John Szwed - album notes

References

External links

Jelly Roll Morton albums
2005 compilation albums
Rounder Records compilation albums
Grammy Award for Best Historical Album
Oral history